Inga suberosa is a species of plant in the family Fabaceae. It is found only in Brazil.

References

suberosa
Flora of Brazil
Endangered plants
Taxonomy articles created by Polbot